Brookville Presbyterian Church and Manse is a historic Presbyterian church located at White and Main Streets in Brookville, Jefferson County, Pennsylvania, United States. The church was built in 1904–1905, and is a Richardsonian Romanesque-style building built of Hummelstown brownstone.  It features two entrances, each set in a loggia, and a square bell tower.  The interior is designed in the Akron plan. The manse was built in 1890, and is a brick Second Empire-style dwelling.  It features two, 2-story bay windows; a mansard roof; and an open porch.

It was added to the National Register of Historic Places in 1982.  It is located in the Brookville Historic District.

References

Presbyterian churches in Pennsylvania
Churches on the National Register of Historic Places in Pennsylvania
Richardsonian Romanesque architecture in Pennsylvania
Romanesque Revival church buildings in Pennsylvania
Second Empire architecture in Pennsylvania
Churches completed in 1890
19th-century Presbyterian church buildings in the United States
Churches in Jefferson County, Pennsylvania
Akron Plan church buildings
National Register of Historic Places in Jefferson County, Pennsylvania
Historic district contributing properties in Pennsylvania